Arniston Rangers Football Club are a Scottish football club, based in the town of Gorebridge. They play in the East of Scotland Football League (Conference A), having moved from the SJFA East Region Premier League in 2018. Nicknamed "the Gers", they were formed in 1878 and presently play their home games at Newbyres Park, which has room for 3,000 spectators. They wear maroon strips (uniforms). Ground problems at Newbyres meant that some home games during the 2008–09 season were played at Musselburgh.

Honours
Scottish Junior Cup
 Runners-up: 1922–23

Other honours
 Edinburgh & District League winners: 1953–54
 East Region Division One winners: 1969–70, 1971–72
 Fife & Lothians Cup winners: 1975–76, 1997–98
 East Region Division Two winners: 1994–95
 East of Scotland Junior Cup winners: 1909–10, 1912–13, 1921–22, 1922–23, 1947–48, 1970–71, 1980–81
 Brown Cup winners: 1975–76
 Andy Kelly Cup 2008
 St Michaels Cup 2005–06

Former players
1. Players that have played/managed in the top two divisions of the Scottish Football League or any foreign equivalent to this level (i.e. fully professional league).2. Players with full international caps.3. Players that hold a club record or have captained the club.
 Paddy Crossan
 Willie Wilson
 Scott Nisbet
 Darren McGregor

References

External links
 Official club site

 
Football clubs in Scotland
Scottish Junior Football Association clubs
Football in Midlothian
Association football clubs established in 1878
1878 establishments in Scotland
East of Scotland Football League teams